Tommy Furey, known as Tommy Tom Furey (1898-1979) was an Irish Volunteer.

Tommy Tom Furey was a native of Oranbeg, Oranmore, and was a founding member of the Oranmore Irish volunteers, established in 1914. Too young to carry a gun, he became a dispatch rider.

On the Tuesday after Easter Sunday 1916, the Oranmore Company assembled at 10.00 a.m. under the command of Captain Joe Howley. Furey participated in the following attack on the local R.I.C. station, which failed. They retreated to Clairinbridge where they were joined by the Clarinbridge and Maree companies, following which the three companies march back to Oranmore, and decided to march to Athenry to join up with the local company under command of Larry Lardner. This followed on information that a detachment of the British army led by Captain Morcombe were on the way from Galway.

Captain Morcombe and his force reached the centre of Oranmore just as the last of the volunteers were leaving and a brief battle ensued. Furey remained with the volunteers over the next ten days, and participated in the seizing of Moyode Castle, Athenry. With the failure of the rebellion in Dublin the Galway companies disbanded, Furey and his brother Patsy returning home. They, along with almost all of the Oranmore company, were arrested, though their brother Johnny escaped to Connemara. Transferred to Arbour Hill, Dublin, the Furey brothers were two of fourteen men from Oranmore - including their cousin, Tom Furey of Bushfield - court martialed and sentenced to five years penal servitude. They were shipped to Britain, serving time in Dartmoor prison.

Furey met Éamon de Valera, also imprisoned at Dartmoor, and participated in a protest against wearing prison clothes. This resulted in Furey being chained to Thomas Ashe, Eoin McNeill, Tommy Hunter, J.J. Walsh, and Bill Cosgrave for the duration of their day-long transfer to Lewes Prison, Brighton. In Lewes, Furey against participated in agitation, this time to be accorded Prisoner of War status, which resulted in being chained in gangs of seven and a diet of bread and water.

On 15 June 1917, all prisoners were released and given five shillings to return to Ireland. He had served time in a total of eight prisons.

On being asked by his granddaughter, Brenda Furey, why he never tried to escape, he stated "Your couldn't, there would be police with ammunition, continually walking around the wall, and even if we did where would we go because we didn't even know the country."

Upon his return, he and other prisoners posed for a group photograph. In later life he was a valued source for local historians on the background and events of the Easter Rebellion in Galway, the only other one in the country outside of Dublin.

References

 The History of Oranmore Maree, Brenda Furey, Galway, 1991.

People from County Galway
People of the Easter Rising
1898 births
1979 deaths